Glas Bheinn (776 m) is a mountain in the Northwest Highlands of Scotland. It lies in the Assynt area of Sutherland, in the far north of the country.

A steep and rugged mountain in its own right, Britain's highest waterfall, the Eas a' Chual Aluinn, falls from its slopes.

Glas Bheinn lies between Ullapool and Durness.

References

Mountains and hills of the Northwest Highlands
Marilyns of Scotland
Corbetts